The Liber maiolichinus de gestis pisanorum illustribus ("Majorcan Book of the Deeds of the Illustrious Pisans") is a Medieval Latin epic chronicle in 3,500 hexameters, written between 1117 and 1125, detailing the Pisan-led joint military expedition of Italians, Catalans, and Occitans against the taifa of the Balearic Islands, in particular Majorca and Ibiza, in 1113–5. It was commissioned by the commune of Pisa, and its anonymous author was probably a cleric. It survives in three manuscripts. The Liber is notable for containing the earliest known reference to "Catalans" (Catalanenses), treated as an ethnicity, and to "Catalonia" (Catalania), as their homeland. 

The Liber, which is the most important primary source for the brief conquest of the Balearics, portrays the expedition as motivated by a desire to free Christian captives held as slaves by the Muslims and to curtail Muslim piracy "from Spain to Greece". Christian zeal is stressed no less than civic pride and the account of the 1113 expedition is prefaced by a history of Pisan–Muslim conflicts in the eleventh century. The Liber is also the earliest source for the raid of the Norwegian king Sigurd Jorsalfar on Formentera, one of the Balearic islands and a hotbed of piracy.

Notes

External links
Latin text of the Liber maiolichinus with Spanish introduction

1113–1115 Balearic Islands expedition
Medieval Latin poetry
Crusade chronicles
12th-century Latin literature

 An article on the Liber maiorichinus and other Pisan texts of the same period